elin o'Hara slavick is an interdisciplinary artist, poet, professor, curator, critic and activist. She began teaching in the department of art at the University of North Carolina at Chapel Hill in 1994, where she held the titles of distinguished term professor, associate chair and director of graduate studies.

Career 
Slavick received a BA from Sarah Lawrence College and a MFA in photography from the School of the Art Institute of Chicago. Her work has been exhibited internationally in both solo and group exhibitions. Her published books include Bomb After Bomb: A Violent Cartography (with a forward from Howard Zinn) and After Hiroshima (with an essay by James Elkins). She was once represented by Cohen Gallery in Los Angeles.

In 2018, she has published a chapbook of Surrealist poems entitled Cameramouth (SurVision Books, Ireland.)

Personal life 
Slavick was raised by a German mother and a Catholic father, and began taking photographs as a young child. Her parents were leftists. Slavick is married to epidemiologist David Richardson and has two children.

References

External links 
 Official website

Year of birth missing (living people)
Living people
Sarah Lawrence College alumni
School of the Art Institute of Chicago alumni
University of North Carolina at Chapel Hill faculty
Surrealist poets